Kaymakçı is a town in İzmir Province, Turkey.

Geography 
Kaymakçı is a part of Ödemiş district of İzmir Province.
The population of Kaymakçı is 5745 as of 2017.

History 

The area around Kaymakçı was captured by Mehmet of Aydın dynasty in 1308. Although Ottoman Empire annexed the area at the end of the 14th century, after the battle of Ankara, Timur,  now the suzerain of Anatolian beyliks, reestablished Aydın authority in 1403. But during the Ottoman revival Ottomans ended the Aydın dynasty in 1426. The settlement was established during the 17th century by a Turkmen tribe. After the first World War the settlement became a battle ground between the advancing Greek army and the militia (Turkish National Movement) of Gökçen Efe. But after Gökçen Efe was killed in November 1919, the settlement was occupied by the Greek army. After the Turkish War of Independence Kaymakçı was returned to Turkey. In 1939 it was declared a seat of township.

Economy 
The main agricultural crops are fruits (like plum) and vegetables (like peas and horse bean). The town also hosts an organized industrial estete.

References

Populated places in İzmir Province
Towns in Turkey
Ödemiş District